The Northern Europe cotton price is an average of the five lowest prices of several internationally traded cottons (including cost, insurance, and freight) quoted for delivery in Northern Europe. The NE price is used by USDA in its formula for calculating the adjusted world price, used in administering marketing assistance loan and step 2 payment benefits under the cotton price support program.

References 

Cotton industry
Foreign trade of the United States
United States Department of Agriculture